Millikan may refer to:

People
 Bud Millikan (1920–2010), Maryland Terrapins head basketball coach 1950-1967
 Clark Blanchard Millikan (1903–1966), professor of aeronautics and son of Robert Andrews Millikan
 Glenn Allan Millikan (1906–1947), physiologist, inventor of Millikan oximeter and son of Robert Andrews Millikan
 Joe Millikan (born 1950), racecar driver
 Max Millikan (1913-1969), American economist
 Robert Andrews Millikan (1868–1953), Nobel Prize–winning physicist
 Millikan oil drop experiment
 Ruth Millikan (born 1933), American philosopher of biology, psychology, and language
 Edward E. Simmons (1911–2004), aka "Millikan Man"

Other
 Millikan (crater), on the Moon
 Millikan High School, Long Beach, California
 Millikan Middle School, Los Angeles Unified School District
 Millikan Way station, on the MAX Blue Line in Washington County, Oregon

See also
 Millican (disambiguation)
 Milligan (disambiguation)
 Milliken (disambiguation)
 Millikin (disambiguation)
 Robert A. Millikan House, Chicago, Illinois